The Hausstein is a mountain in Bavaria, Germany.

The  Hausstein ("House-stone") is a mountain in the Anterior Bavarian Forest, southwest of the Lower Bavarian town of Regen, and northeast of the town of Deggendorf, and is located in the municipality of Schaufling, in the district of Deggendorf.

North of the mountain is the Rusel; on the south side is located in panoramic position, the Asklepios Clinic of Schaufling.

Mountains under 1000 metres
Mountains of Bavaria